Warm Springs Creek is a stream or arroyo, and a tributary of Murrieta Creek, in Riverside County, Southern California.

Geography

It continues past the community of Murrieta Hot Springs (a former census-designated place that is now part of the city of Murrieta) on its east bank, running under Murrieta Hot Springs Road.

See also
Plains of Leon

References

Warm Springs Creek
Warm Springs Creek
Rivers of Southern California